Spheres is the fourth studio album by Nekropolis, released independently in 1988.

Track listing

Personnel
Adapted from the Spheres liner notes.
 Peter Frohmader – electronics

Release history

References

External links 
 Spheres at Discogs (list of releases)

1988 albums
Nekropolis albums